This is a list of crossings of the River Severn in Great Britain (including bridges, tunnels, ferries and fords), in order from source to mouth.

The Severn has historically been a very important and busy river, and has been bridged throughout history. The bridges that stand today are often of great historical and/or engineering interest. For example, the world's first iron bridge, The Iron Bridge, built from cast iron, crosses the River Severn at Ironbridge Gorge. The Iron Bridge is one of three bridges on the River Severn that are listed as grade I structures, including Bewdley Bridge and the Severn Bridge, which was opened in 1966. In total, 31 bridges that cross the River Severn are listed, either grade I, II* or II. Four bridges are scheduled monuments, including The Iron Bridge, which are nationally important archaeological bridges.

Many reaches of the Severn are prone to severe flooding, prompting the design of some unique bridges to cope with this.

There were historically also ferry crossings on the tidal river at:
 Minsterworth
 Framilode
 Purton, Lydney
 Newnham on Severn



Crossings

In order, moving downstream:

See also

Severn crossing
List of crossings of the River Wye
List of bridges in Wales
List of disasters on the Severn
Severn bore
Severn Way

Bibliography

References 

 
Lists of bridges in the United Kingdom
Severn
Lists of coordinates